Robert Ian "Chief" Taylor (born January 24, 1945) is a Canadian former professional ice hockey goaltender. He played 45 games in the National Hockey League with the Philadelphia Flyers and Pittsburgh Penguins between 1972 and 1976.

Broadcasting career

Beginning with the 2015–16 season, Taylor became a studio analyst on the Tampa Bay Lightning pre- and post-game telecasts and between period segments. Until the end of the 2014–15 season, he was the color commentator on Tampa Bay Lightning television broadcasts beginning in 1993, the team's second year of play. Previously, he held the same role for the Philadelphia Flyers alongside legendary hockey announcer Gene Hart, Hall of Fame broadcaster Mike Emrick, and Bob Galerstein from 1976 through 1992 on both television (1977–88) and radio (1988–92). Hart and Taylor called the action in a simulcast of Channel 29/57 and PRISM along with 610 WIP from 1984–88. He was a member of the Philadelphia Flyers teams that won the Stanley Cup in 1974 and 1975.

On April 9, 2015, Taylor completed his final regular season broadcast as the color commentator for the Tampa Bay Lightning. Taylor shifted to a teaching role on the pre and post-game shows beginning with the following season. Going into his final 2014-15 game Taylor said: "It's getting a little nostalgic, it's been a long time...I've been in that booth a heck of a long time. I'm excited, yet sad at the same time."

Career statistics

Regular season and playoffs

References

External links
 
Bobby Taylor's biography at Hockey Goalies

1945 births
Living people
Canadian ice hockey goaltenders
Edmonton Oil Kings (WCHL) players
Jersey Devils players
National Hockey League broadcasters
Philadelphia Flyers announcers
Philadelphia Flyers players
Pittsburgh Penguins players
Quebec Aces (AHL) players
Richmond Robins players
St. Catharines Black Hawks players
Seattle Totems (WHL) players
Ice hockey people from Calgary
Springfield Indians players
Stanley Cup champions
Tampa Bay Lightning announcers